A Man Called Sloane is an American secret agent adventure television series that aired on NBC during the 1979–1980 television season. It was a Woodruff Production in association with QM Productions and became the final series produced by Quinn Martin's company to debut. 
A Man Called Sloane was an amalgam of elements from numerous spy series of the previous 15 years, including The Man from U.N.C.L.E., Mission: Impossible, and Conrad's own The Wild Wild West. One of the more expensive series produced during the season, it failed to gain an audience and was cancelled after 12 episodes were broadcast.
It is also one of only three QM series not to have an announcer accompanying the opening titles, one of two not to display a copyright notice at the beginning but rather at the end, and the only one not to have a "Tonight's Episode" card or the "Act I/II/III/IV/Epilog" formatting — the episode titles still appear onscreen, but they appear as part of the episode credits rather than during the standard opening.

Synopsis
The series starred Robert Conrad as Thomas R. Sloane III, a freelance spy who takes on occasional assignments for UNIT, a secret American intelligence operation run by The Director, played by Dan O'Herlihy. Unlike nearly all the other stars of series produced by QM Productions, Conrad was billed above the title. The secret entrance to UNIT headquarters was through a toy store. KARTEL was the evil secret organization that was UNIT's nemesis. Aiding Sloane's missions was Torque, his deadly right-hand man played by Ji-Tu Cumbuka. Torque had a mechanical hand with interchangeable parts (drill, saw blade, etc.) that often helped during their assignments. The pair was also assisted by Effie, a computer voiced by Michele Carey.

Related media
On March 5, 1981, NBC aired a TV movie, Death Ray 2000, which was actually the original pilot for the series. The movie starred Robert Logan as Sloane and Cumbuka  played Torque as a villain. Logan was originally supposed to play Sloane on the series, but Fred Silverman stated he did not like Logan and wanted Robert Conrad.

Episodes

Notes

References

External links 
 
  (original pilot film)

NBC original programming
Espionage television series
American adventure television series
1979 American television series debuts
1979 American television series endings
Television series by CBS Studios
English-language television shows
Television shows set in Chicago